Fərcan (also, Fardzhan and Ferdzhan) is a village in the Qubadli Rayon of Azerbaijan.
Fərcan is the Azeri village in Qubadli

References 

Populated places in Qubadli District